Tôn Thất Hải (16 July 1935) is a Vietnamese fencer. He competed in the individual épée event at the 1952 Summer Olympics.

References

External links
 

1935 births
Living people
Vietnamese male fencers
Olympic fencers of Vietnam
Fencers at the 1952 Summer Olympics